During the reconquista, the siege of Córdoba (1236) was a successful investment by the forces of Ferdinand III, king of Castile and León, marking the end of the Islamic rule over the city that had begun in 711.

In capturing the city, Ferdinand certainly benefited from the rivalry between the two main competing taifa rulers following the dissolution of the Almohad authority, itself triggered by the Battle of Las Navas de Tolosa. The siege however began in unusual circumstances, with little preparation.

Upon receiving information that part of the inhabitants of the eastern quarter of Cordoba—called Ajarquia—were disaffected with their rulers, a handful of almogávars led by knights acting on their own initiative scaled a tower during a rainy winter night of 1235–1236, and after meeting their contacts inside, they eventually seized control of the neighborhood. The almogávars, some of whom spoke Arabic, were most likely employed as Castilian border guards in the Andújar region, because this is where they assembled before mounting their daring operation. The whole episode has been subject to varying interpretations. The Primera Crónica General highlighted the heroic act of the leading knights, while later Spanish historian Julio González emphasized that help from within city walls must have been a significant factor in the success of this takeover, for it met with little opposition in Ajarquia. After the city fell to Ferdinand, a tower and nearby gate in Ajarquia were named after Alvaro Colodro, a knight who the chronicles record as having led the climb. The precise date of this coup de main is also a bit unclear; it is most likely it happened in last week of 1235.

The Christian soldiers certainly killed a number of the Muslim inhabitants of Ajarquia, and some survivors took refuge in the better-off Al Medina quarter, the sociopolitical center of the city. Because an inner wall separated the two quarters, a bloody standoff followed, with significant losses on both sides, but with neither being able to make significant progress. The Christians however immediately sent word to neighboring border forces, most notably those of Álvaro Pérez de Castro, who reinforced them, and they also asked king Ferdinand for help.

What is more certain is that the event took Ferdinand by surprise, as he had concluded a truce with Ibn Hud. Throwing caution to the wind, Ferdinand rode with a small band of knights to, no more than 100, although they may have been as few as 30 at one point. He arrived at Córdoba on February 7, 1236, after traveling through rainstorms and a flooded country.

References 

Conflicts in 1236
Battles of the Reconquista
History of Córdoba, Spain
Cordoba 1236
Cordoba 1236
1236 in Europe
13th century in Al-Andalus
13th century in Castile